Battle of Menaka may refer to:

 Battle of Menaka (January 2012), Menaka, Mali; an attack by Azawad that started the Toureg rebellion
 Battle of Menaka (November 2012), Menaka, Mali; the last battle and defeat of the state of Azawad
 2019 Ménaka attack, Menaka Region, Mali; an attack by the Islamic State

See also
 Menaka (disambiguation)